Alessandro Lazzeroni (born 4 May 1955) is an Italian volleyball player. He competed in the men's tournament at the 1988 Summer Olympics.

References

External links
 

1955 births
Living people
Italian men's volleyball players
Olympic volleyball players of Italy
Volleyball players at the 1988 Summer Olympics
Sportspeople from Pisa